Hibernation is the second album by Italian duo Chrisma, released in 1979 by record label Polydor. It was produced by Niko Papathanassiou.

Track listing

References

External links 

 

1979 albums
Chrisma albums